Branch River is the name of several rivers:

Australia
The Branch River

Canada
 Branch River (Newfoundland) in Newfoundland-Labrador

New Zealand
Branch River (Taylor River tributary)
Branch River (Wairau River tributary)

United States
Branch River (New Hampshire), a tributary of Salmon Falls River
The Branch, also known as "Branch River", New Hampshire, a tributary of Ashuelot River
Branch River (Rhode Island)
Branch River (Wisconsin)